The Centres Against Sexual Assault (CASA) are non-profit, government funded organisations in Victoria, Australia. They provide support and intervention to women, children and men who are victim/survivors of sexual assault. It is the country's largest network of its sort.

The first Centre Against Sexual Assault was established at Melbourne's Royal Women's Hospital in the mid 1990s under the leadership of Kate Gilmore.

See also 
 Rape crisis center
 Feminist movement

References

External links 
Victorian Centres Against Sexual Assault

Sexual abuse advocacy and support groups
Organisations based in Melbourne
Organisations based in Victoria (Australia)